7 Piscium is a single star in the zodiac constellation of Pisces, located around 343 light-years away from the Sun. It has the Bayer designation b Piscium; 7 Piscium is the Flamsteed designation. This object is visible to the naked eye as a faint, orange-hued star with an apparent visual magnitude of 5.07. It is moving further from the Earth with a heliocentric radial velocity of 40 km/s.

This is a metal-deficient giant star with a stellar classification of K1 IV. It is a red clump giant, which indicates it is on the horizontal branch and is generating energy through the fusion of helium at its core. The star is 4.58 billion years old with 1.37 times the mass of the Sun.

References

K-type giants
Horizontal-branch stars
Pisces (constellation)
Piscium, b
Durchmusterung objects
Piscium, 007
220009
115227
8878